is a Japanese former footballer who played as a midfielder.

Career
Ishikawa formerly played for Philippines Football League side Stallion Laguna.

Career statistics

Club

Notes

References

1988 births
Living people
Japanese footballers
Japanese expatriate footballers
Association football midfielders
Suzuka Point Getters players
Fukushima United FC players
FC Osaka players
FB Gulbene players
Lanexang United F.C. players
Stallion Laguna F.C. players
Latvian Higher League players
Japanese expatriate sportspeople in Latvia
Expatriate footballers in Latvia
Japanese expatriate sportspeople in Laos
Expatriate footballers in Laos
Japanese expatriate sportspeople in Thailand
Expatriate footballers in Thailand
Japanese expatriate sportspeople in the Philippines
Expatriate footballers in the Philippines
Expatriate footballers in Mongolia
Expatriate footballers in Cambodia
Japanese expatriate sportspeople in Cambodia